Rabbitt Trax is the tenth studio album by American country music artist Eddie Rabbitt, released in 1986 by RCA Records. The album produced four singles including "A World Without Love", "Repetitive Regret", "Both to Each Other (Friends and Lovers)" (a duet with the country-pop star Juice Newton) and "Gotta Have You". All of these singles reached the top ten on country charts, with the duet reaching No. 1.

Track listing

Charts

Weekly charts

Year-end charts

Singles

References

[ Rabbitt Trax], Allmusic.

1985 albums
Eddie Rabbitt albums
RCA Records albums
Albums produced by Richard Landis